Carlos Sánchez (19 July 1952 – 2 March 2021) was an Argentine comedian, actor, and singer.

Biography
Sánchez began his career in the theatre, acting in Villa Carlos Paz and Mar del Plata. He appeared on television programs such as Moria Banana, Videomatch, Cantando por un Sueño, and Susana Giménez. He was also summoned to appear on El humor de Café Fashion. He acted in the 1997 film , directed by Hugo Sofovich.

Carlos Sánchez died of kidney cancer in Buenos Aires on 2 March 2021 at the age of 68.

Filmography

Cinema
La herencia del tío Pepe (1997)

Television
Moria Banana (1995)
Hola Susana (1995–2000)
Petardos (1998)
Videomatch (1998–2000)
Café Fashion (1999–2000)
 (2001)
La Peluquería de Don Mateo (2005)
Cantando por un Sueño (2012)
Sábado Show (2012)
Argentina, tierra de amor y venganza (2019)

References

1952 births
2021 deaths
Argentine comedians
Argentine actors
20th-century Argentine male singers